La Red Turística de Pueblos Patrimonio  ("The Tourism Network of Heritage Towns") is an initiative led by Colombia's Ministry of Commerce, Industry, and Tourism, with the assistance of the Ministry of Culture. It is administered by the National Tourism Foundation (FONTUR).

The program seeks to promote tourism in a network of small and mid-sized towns that represent aspects of Colombia's cultural heritage, and to encourage sustainable economic development in these communities. Pueblos Patrimonio are selected from amongst Colombia's inventory of designated Bienes de Interés Cultural (Cultural Heritage Assets) on the merits of their architectural, historical, and environmental characteristics, as well as unique cultural identities, which give them the potential to become "true cultural destinations."

The network was first established in 2010, with an inaugural class of 11 municipalities. As of 1 March 2021, there were 18 designated Pueblos Patrimonio, distributed among 12 of Colombia's 32 departments.

List of Current Pueblos Patrimonio

Potential Additions to the Pueblos Patrimonio Network 
In addition to the 18 municipalities that have been accepted into the network to date, several other Colombian towns are actively seeking the Pueblo Patrimonio designation:

See also 

 Pueblos Mágicos (Mexico)
Pueblos Mágicos (Ecuador)
Pueblos Pintorescos (Guatemala)

References

External links 

 https://www.pueblospatrimonio.com.co/
 https://fontur.com.co/es/programas/red-turistica-de-pueblos-patrimonio
 https://fontur.com.co/sites/default/files/2020-12/GUIA_PUEBLOS_PATRIMONIO.pdf

 
Colombia